Nishi-naga-iwa Glacier is a glacier flowing to the sea between Daruma Rock and Cape Akarui in Queen Maud Land. Mapped from surveys and air photos by Japanese Antarctic Research Expedition (JARE), 1957–62, and, in association with Higashi-naga-iwa Glacier lying 5 nautical miles (9 km) eastward, named Nishi-naga-iwa-hyoga (western long rock glacier).

See also
 List of glaciers in the Antarctic
 Glaciology

References

Glaciers of Queen Maud Land
Prince Olav Coast